The 1962 Texas gubernatorial election was held on November 6, 1962, to elect the governor of Texas. Incumbent Democratic Governor Price Daniel was running for reelection to a fourth term, but was defeated in the primary by John Connally. Although Connally was easily elected, Republican Jack Cox's 46% of the vote was the highest received by any Republican candidate for governor since George C. Butte in 1924.

Primaries

Republican

Democratic

Results

Campaigns

Democratic 
Democratic incumbent Marion Price Daniel, Sr. was running for a fourth consecutive two-year term, but was in political trouble following the enactment of a two-cent state sales tax in 1961, which had soured many voters on his administration. Daniel had let the tax become law without his signature, but chose not to veto the measure.

John Connally announced two weeks before Christmas of 1961 that he was leaving the position of Secretary of the Navy to seek the Democratic nomination. Former state Attorney General Will Wilson also entered the campaign, accusing Lyndon B. Johnson of engineering Connally's candidacy. Other primary candidates were highway commissioner Marshall Formby of Plainview, another party conservative, and General Edwin A. Walker, who made anti-communism the centerpiece of his campaign.

References

1962
Texas
Gubernatorial
November 1962 events in the United States